The Pechanga Band of Indians is a federally recognized tribe of Luiseño Indians based in Riverside County, California, where their reservation is located. As of 2006, there were 1,370 members of the nation. The tribe owns the Pechanga Resort & Casino in Temecula and the naming rights to the San Diego sports arena now known as the Pechanga Arena. 

The tribe was formerly named the Pechanga Band of Luiseno Mission Indians of the Pechanga Reservation.

There are five other federally recognized tribes of Luiseño bands based in Southern California, and an organized band that has not received federal recognition as a tribe.

Government
The Pechanga Band is headquartered in Temecula, California, part of the historic territory associated with their historic ancestors. Today the tribe has a constitution, adopted in 1978, and is governed by a democratically elected, seven-person council, including the Tribal Chairperson. In the event of a voting tie, they would be the deciding vote. The current tribal administration is as follows.

 Tribal Chairman: Mark A. Macarro
 Councilwoman: Catalina Chacon
 Councilman: Michael Vasquez
 Councilman: Raymond Basquez Jr.
 Councilman: Robert "RJ" Munoa
 Councilman: Russell "Butch" Murphy
 Councilman: Mark Luker
 Tribal Secretary: Louise Burke
 Treasurer: Christina "Tina" McMenamin

Reservation
The Pechanga Reservation is a federal Indian reservation located near Temecula, California. Population on the  reservation is about 467; most of the 1,370 members (as of 2006) live off the reservation. The Pechanga Reservation was established in 1882 for the historic Temecula, from whom the Pechanga are descended.

Economic development
The Pechanga Band of Luiseño Mission Indians owns and operates Pechanga Resort & Casino and its restaurants (Bamboo, Blazing Noodles, Blends Coffee & Wine Bar, The Buffet, The Great Oak Steakhouse, Journey's End, Kelsey's, Paisano's Italian, Pechanga Cafe, Umi Sushi & Oyster Bar, The Lobby Bar & Grill, and the Temptations Food Walk). This operation has been highly profitable, yielding more than $200 million a year.

The Pechanga Band of Luiseño Mission Indians owns and operates the publisher Great Oak Press.

Membership

 
The tribe's constitution in 1978 said that members must prove "descent from original Pechanga Temecula people." In 1996 the tribal council tightened the rules, declaring for the first time that "members had to have an ancestor from the subset of Temecula who relocated to the Pechanga valley" where the reservation was established. In cases of disenrollment of large families in 2004 and 2006, Pechanga officials have said they were enforcing rules of membership that required historical residence as well as descent from known Temecula.

Pechanga members moved away in some cases because of economic reasons, but maintained ties to the reservation; including being involved in the nation's activities and development. As with other tribes that have conducted disenrollments, which have increased since the late 20th century, controversy has arisen over application of the 1996 requirements to people of established membership and participation in the nation. Reducing the number of members has increased financial returns paid within the nation from the lucrative casino operations. Pechanga Chairman Mark Macarro has noted that courts have "consistently upheld tribes' sole responsibility for determining their citizenship" and that the disenrollments were not related to money or politics.

In several cases, the Pechanga have disenrolled families who were descended from historic ancestral Temecula, long identified as Pechanga, participated in the nation, and had several members working in a variety of roles for the nation and the casino. An example is John Gomez Jr. and his extended family, who total 135 adult members (plus their children); in 2004 they were officially disenrolled. Another family of 90 adults was disenrolled in early 2006.

In 2002 Gomez and a cousin were elected to the enrollment committee which was struggling to process applications. He said that after he had criticized the committee a group known as Concerned Pechanga People for the first time questioned his qualifications as a tribal member. Several of the group were related to enrollment officials he had criticized. In 2005, Gomez helped found the American Indian Rights and Resources Organization to deal with such civil rights issues. Gomez in 2006 said that the other Pechanga family disenrolled had also opposed tribal leadership.

Michael Madariaga's family was disenrolled in 2006, including his aged grandparents, who lived on the reservation. He said his grandfather had helped upgrade the reservation's water system, provide telephones and electricity, and built the health clinic. He said his grandparents needed their tribal health insurance and felt the loss of financial benefits, but that, his family was most hurt by the loss of their culture and community. He said, "What matters is taking away our heritage" and further, "It's like taking your family and wiping them out of history."

See also
Indigenous peoples of California

Notes

References
 Pritzker, Barry M. A Native American Encyclopedia: History, Culture, and Peoples. Oxford: Oxford University Press, 2000.

External links
 Pechanga Band of Luiseno Mission Indians, official website
 

Native American tribes in California
Federally recognized tribes in the United States
Luiseño
Native American tribes in Riverside County, California